Neopostega longispina is a moth of the family Opostegidae. It is known only from lowland Amazonian rainforest in southern Venezuela near the Brazilian border.

The length of the forewings is 2.8–3 mm. Adults are mostly white. Adults are on wing in February.

Etymology
The species name is derived from the Latin longus (long) and spina (thorn) in reference to the characteristic long, spinose cornutus present in the male aedoeagus of this insect.

External links
A Revision of the New World Plant-Mining Moths of the Family Opostegidae (Lepidoptera: Nepticuloidea)

Opostegidae
Moths described in 2007